The Scuola Grande di San Rocco is a building in Venice, northern Italy. It is noted for its collection of paintings by Tintoretto and generally agreed to include some of his finest work.

History
The building is the seat of a confraternity established in 1478, named after San Rocco, popularly regarded as a protector against plague.   The members of the "Confraternity of St. Roch" were a group of wealthy Venetian citizens. The site they chose for their building is next to the church of San Rocco which houses the remains of the saint.

In January 1515 the project of the building was entrusted to Bartolomeo Bon, although some authorities assign it to his son Pietro Bon. In 1524 his work was continued by Sante Lombardo, who, in turn, three years later was replaced by Antonio Scarpagnino. Following his death in 1549, the last architect to work on the edifice was Giangiacomo dei Grigi, finishing in September 1560.

The design was similar to other scuole in Venice, characterized by two halls, one at ground floor level, the other at first floor level. The Sala Terra (lower) has a nave and two aisles, with the entrance from the campo outside. From this hall a stair (with a landing surmounted by a dome) led to the upper storey. The Sala Superiore ("Upper Hall") was used for meetings of the fellows and had a wooden altar. It provided access to the Sala dell'Albergo, which housed the Banca  and the Zonta (the confraternity's supervisory boards).

Art

In 1564 the painter Tintoretto was commissioned to provide paintings for the Scuola, and his most renowned works are to be found in the Sala dell'Albergo and the Sala Superiore. All the works in the building are by him, or his assistants, including his son Domenico: they were executed between 1564 and 1587.  Works in the sala terra are in homage to the Virgin Mary, and concentrate on episodes from her life.  In the sala superiore, works on the ceiling are from the Old Testament, and on the walls from the New Testament.  Together, they show the biblical story from Fall to Redemption.

A sculpture of Tintoretto with his paintbrushes is featured, as well as a relief carved to look like a bookcase.

Main works include:
Sala Terrena (complete list)
Annunciation
Adoration of the Magi
The Flight into Egypt
The Slaughter of the Innocents
Presentation in the Temple
The Assumption of Mary
St Mary Magdalen
St Mary of Egypt
Sala Superiore (ceiling)
Adam and Eve
Jacob's Ladder
God Appears to Moses
The Passover
The Pillar of Fire
The Fall of Manna in the Desert
Moses Strikes Water from the Rock
Miracle of the Bronze Serpent
Elijah is Fed by the Angels
Elisha Distributes Bread
The Vision of the Prophet Ezekiel
Sala Superiore (walls)
The Adoration of the Shepherds
The Baptism
Christ Tempted by Satan
Christ Heals the Paralytic
Multiplication of Bread and Fishes
The Resurrection of Lazarus
The Last Supper
The Agony in the Garden
The Resurrection
The Ascension
Wooden: episodes of the Old Testament by Giuseppe Angeli
Sala dell'Albergo
Allegory of St. John's Guild
Allegory of St. Mark's Guild
Allegory of St. Theodore's Guild
Allegory of the Charity Guild
Allegory of the Misericordia (Mercy) Guild
Christ Before Pilate
Ecce Homo (The Crowning with Thorns)
Ascent to Calvary
The Crucifixion
The Apotheosis of St. Roch

Other works present include paintings by Titian and Palma il Giovane, and a series of wooden panels with allegorical figures in the Chapter house carved by Francesco Pianta between 1657 and 1658.

Music
In its heyday the scuola was an important patron of music, employing musicians such as Giovanni Gabrieli. Gabrieli took on the post of organist in addition to his work at St Mark's, and he composed music specifically for the location. A contemporary account of how the music impressed an English traveller was published in Coryat's Crudities (1611).

In 1958 Stravinsky's Threni was premiered at the scuola with the composer conducting.

Access and conservation
The Scuola Grande is open daily all the year round, except for Christmas Day and January 1.

The paintings were in need of conservation work, and have been restored by the World Monuments Fund.

Notes

References
 
 *

External links
  
 Official website 

Religious buildings and structures completed in 1560
16th-century Roman Catholic church buildings in Italy
Scuole Grandi of Venice
Renaissance architecture in Venice
Tintoretto
Plague monuments and memorials